Forest City is a census-designated place and an area in Seminole County, Florida, United States. Its historic center is now in the City of Altamonte Springs. Data in this article deals only with the unincorporated section. The population was 12,612 at the 2000 census. It is part of the Orlando–Kissimmee Metropolitan Statistical Area.

Geography

Demographics

As of the census of 2000, there were 12,612 people, 4,777 households, and 3,363 families residing in the CDP. The racial makeup of the CDP was 85.32% White, 4.86% African American, 0.25% Native American, 3.40% Asian, 0.04% Pacific Islander, 3.64% from other races, and 2.49% from two or more races. Hispanic or Latino of any race were 15.57% of the population.

There were 4,777 households, out of which 35.4% had children under the age of 18 living with them, 56.2% were married couples living together, 10.5% had a female householder with no husband present, and 29.6% were non-families. 23.7% of all households were made up of individuals, and 5.6% had someone living alone who was 65 years of age or older.  The average household size was 2.62 and the average family size was 3.12.

In the CDP, the population was spread out, with 25.5% under the age of 18, 7.4% from 18 to 24, 33.3% from 25 to 44, 22.8% from 45 to 64, and 11.0% who were 65 years of age or older.  The median age was 36 years. For every 100 females, there were 96.5 males.  For every 100 females age 18 and over, there were 93.6 males.

The median income for a household in the CDP was $50,191, and the median income for a family was $55,109. Males had a median income of $40,669 versus $30,259 for females. The per capita income for the CDP was $24,464.  About 4.2% of families and 6.0% of the population were below the poverty line, including 8.3% of those under age 18 and 9.2% of those age 65 or over.

References

External links
 Seminole County Convention and Visitors Bureau

Census-designated places in Seminole County, Florida
Greater Orlando
Census-designated places in Florida